Vehicle registration plates in China are mandatory metal or plastic plates attached to motor vehicles in mainland China for official identification purposes. The plates are issued by the local traffic management offices, which are sub-branches of local public security bureaus, under the rules of the Ministry of Public Security.

Hong Kong and Macau, both of which are special administrative regions of China, issue their own licence plates, a legacy of when they were under British and Portuguese administration. Vehicles from Hong Kong and Macau are required to apply for licence plates, usually from Guangdong province, to travel on roads in Mainland China. Vehicles from Mainland China have to apply for Hong Kong licence plates or Macau licence plates to enter those territories.

The font used are in the Heiti (Traditional: 黑體, Simplified: 黑体) style.

History

1986-series plate

In July 1986, the 1986-Series Plates were put into use. The layout and format for them are listed out as follows:
{| class="wikitable"
!Vehicle type
!Colouring
!Size (mm)
!Notes
|-
|Light passenger/cargo vehicles
|style="background:forestgreen; color:white;"|White on light green
| rowspan="6" |300@165
|May come with a letter replacing the first number.
|-
|Heavy goods vehicles
|style="background:mediumvioletred; color:white;"|White on violet
|
|-
|Heavy/light hand-assisted tractors,
special-use vehicles, electric cars
|style="background:gold; color:black;"|Black on yellow
|
|-
|Testing vehicles and training vehicles
|style="background:mediumblue; color:white;"|White on blue
|
|-
|Foreigner-owned vehicles
|style="background:black; color:white;"|White on black
|Red-on-black for limited-activity
(i.e. only allowed to drive within city limits denoted by the regional code)
|-
|Trailers
|style="background:white; color:black;"|Black on white
|
|-
|Plate replacement permits
|style="background:white; color:red;"|Red on white
| rowspan="4" |200 × 120
|
|-
|Temporary plates
|style="background:white; color:black;"|Black on white
|
|-
|Two/three-wheeled motorcycles
|style="background:forestgreen; color:white;"|White on light green
|
|-
|Light motorcycles
|style="background:white; color:mediumvioletred;"|Violet on white
|
|}

Hong Kong and Macau vehicles are issued with plates for Shenzhen and Zhuhai, respectively. Red-on-black plate-bearing vehicles are only allowed to drive within said cities. White-on-black vehicles are permitted to drive within Guangdong province, while if the vehicles are issued with green or violet plates according to their types, they have no area limitations.

The regional codes are as follows:

{| class=wikitable
!Region
!Code
|-
|Anhui
|
|-
|Beijing
|
|-
|Fujian
|
|-
|Gansu
|
|-
|Guangdong
|
|-
|Guangxi
|
|-
|Guizhou
|
|-
|Hainan
|
|-
|Hebei
|
|-
|Heilongjiang
|
|-
|Henan
|
|-
|Hubei
|
|-
|Hunan
|
|-
|Inner Mongolia
|
|-
|Jiangsu
|
|-
|Jiangxi
|
|-
|Jilin
|
|-
|Liaoning
|
|-
|Ningxia
|
|-
|Qinghai
|
|-
|Shaanxi
|
|-
|Shandong
|
|-
|Shanghai
|
|-
|Shanxi
|
|-
|Sichuan
|
|-
|Tianjin
|
|-
|Tibet
|
|-
|Xinjiang
|
|-
|Yunnan
|
|-
|Zhejiang
|
|}

Note: Chongqing was separated from Sichuan as a directly-administered city in 1997, and the 1986-series standard was abolished in 1997 as well, therefore Public security vehicles in Chongqing bear the Sichuan code of GA51, instead of the later-introduced GA50.

Current Series types

Common types

The current plates are of GA36-2014 standard, a further update of the original GA36-1992, made from GB/T 3880.1 and GB/T 3880.2-compliant aluminum material with a thickness of no less than 1.2mm (for rear plates for large vehicles and trailers) or 1.0mm (for any other non-temporary plates), or 200-220g dedicated watermarked paper with plastic sealing for automobiles and motorcycles entering the border on a temporary basis, or 125g white paper-card for temporary license plates. The plates accommodate a one-character provincial abbreviation, a letter of the Pinyin alphabet, and five numbers or letters of the alphabet (Ex. ; ; ;). Previously, all licence plates had used the five-number designation. As the number of motor vehicles grew, however, the number had to exceed what was the maximum previously allowable—90,000 or 100,000 vehicles. Therefore, there had become a need to insert Latin letters into the license plate to increase the number of possible combinations (for the full list of alphanumeric sequences permitted see below). This was first done in the bigger cities with only one prefix. Nanjing, for example, began the change with only the first number, which increased the number of possible combinations to 340,000 (with the exceptions of O & I, which cannot be printed without confusion with the numbers 0 & 1). Further changes allowed the first two places, or the second place alone on the plate to be letters, allowing 792,000 more combinations mathematically. More recently, cities have taken to having the third letter alone being a letter, the rest numbers.

Permitted alphanumeric combinations per GA36-2014 standard are listed in the table below. Should the number of combinations issued exceed 60% of the theoretical capacity of its type, the combination next in the list may be put into use after approval from the Vehicle Management Office of the provincial Public Security authority and reporting to the Vehicle Management Office of the Ministry of Public Security.

Note: Y and N in this table reflects whether or not this combination type may be used in registration plates with 4 or 5 places for digits/numbers, while D and L represents any permitted digit or letter respectively.

The numbers are produced at random, and are computer-generated at the issuing office. Numbers with a sequence of 6s, 8s, or 9s are usually considered to be lucky, therefore special sequences like "88888" or "86888" can be purchased through auction. A previous licence plate system, with a green background and the full name of the province in Chinese characters, actually had a sequential numbering order, and the numbering system was eventually beset with corruption.

License plates have different formats that are issued to different vehicles:

Since October 2007, black plates are no longer issued for vehicles belonging to foreigners, as this was "deemed discriminatory" and instead standard looking blue plates are now issued. The black plates are still issued to those who registered in both Mainland China and Hong Kong or Macau, specifically in Guangdong province, which are in the sequence of 粤Z·####港/澳.

Registration combinations of written-off vehicles may be "recycled", or used again on a different vehicle only after 6 months from the write-off according to relevant regulations, but as a matter of fact, certain serials of number like 京A·##### in Beijing is not available for general public once recycled for unspecified reasons. In 2015, a former Commissioner of Beijing Traffic Management Bureau, the traffic branch of Beijing Municipal Public Safety Bureau, was sentenced for life, having been found guilty of corruption relating to fraud in issuing these licence plate combinations.

Police Service, Armed Police Force, and Military

Licence plates for China's Police Service, Armed Police Force, and Military are in a white background, with red and black text.

Police Service plates have a designated format of X·LLNNN (X is the geographical abbreviation, N is a digit, and L is either a digit or a letter; "" means police and is coloured red, but the separator dot is no longer a circle, rather, a dash). These plates are issued to traffic police, some patrol vehicles, court, and procuratorate vehicles.

The plates’ combination of the Chinese People's Armed Police Force ("") begins with the pinyin wujing abbreviation WJ.

The 2012 series of CAPF vehicle registration plates is in the WJ P NNNNL pattern, where the stands for a Chinese character i.e. 京 for Beijing, serving as the provincial identifier, and the L denotes the first letter in pinyin of the branch of service. e.g.  WJ = a vehicle for firefighting use in Shanghai

The 2004 series use the format WJNN-NNNNN.
The first two small letters behind the WJ are area prefixes:
WJ01-NNNNN.  = Headquarters
WJ31-NNNNN.  = Beijing
WJ14-NNNNN.  = Shandong
WJ21-NNNNN.  = Hainan
The Alphabet Numeral behind the area prefix shows the section of the Armed police:
WJ01-JNNNN.  = Official Guards, Official and Diplomatic Escorts
WJ01-BNNNN.  = Border Police
WJ01-XNNNN.  = Firefighter (Fire Department)
WJ01-1NNNN.  = Headquarters

Military vehicles previously had plates using a code of heavenly stems in red. After reorganization in 2004, again in 2013 military vehicles now use a more organized prefix. These licence plates use the format XL·NNNNN (X is a prefix, L is a letter).

The People's Liberation Army vehicle prefixes 2013:
Military vehicles can be identified by having a red letter from the alphabet *V
V PLA Central Military Commission
K PLA Air Force
H PLA Navy
B PLA Beijing Military
VA PLA Central Military Commission
VB PLA Political Works
VC PLA Logistical Support 
VD PLA Equipment Development

The People's Liberation Army vehicle prefixes 2004:
"" (Jūn; "Military")
Vehicles of the Central Military Commission
Vehicles of the Headquarters of People's Liberation Army
Vehicles of the PLA's units at Army-Grade or above. Deputy-Military-Region-Grade, Military-Region-Grade.
The Ground Force of PLA vehicle of the various military regions have their own prefixes:
"" (Beǐ) Vehicles of the Beijing Military Region of Ground Force)
"" (Shěn); Vehicles of the Shenyang Military Region of Ground Force)
"" (Lán); Vehicles of the Lanzhou Military Region of Ground Force)
"" (Chéng); Vehicles of the Chengdu Military Region of Ground Force)
"" (Jǐ); Vehicles of the Jinan Military Region of Ground Force)
"" (Nán); Vehicles of the Nanjing Military Region of Ground Force)
"" (Guǎng); Vehicles of the Guangzhou Military Region of Ground Force)
The Navy of PLA vehicle prefixes:
"" (Haǐ)
The Air Force of PLA vehicle prefixes:
"" (Kōng)

Vehicles with government or military plates are not subject to the Road Traffic Safety Law of the People's Republic of China (中华人民共和国道路交通安全法); they may run red lights, drive in the wrong direction or weave in and out of traffic. Communist party officials and People's Liberation Army members are also exempt from paying road tolls and adhering to parking regulations. According to Xinhua News Agency, "police officers are also reluctant to pull over drivers of military vehicles even if the drivers are breaking the law", which is the reason behind an emerging trend in which individuals purchase counterfeit military registration plates to avoid being pulled over by police and to avoid road fees. Xinhua News Agency reported in 2008 that since July 2006, the government has confiscated over 4,000 fake military vehicles and 6,300 fake plates and has apprehended over 5,000 people belonging to criminal gangs; under Chinese law, those caught driving under fake registration plates are fined up to 2,000 RMB, and counterfeiters can be jailed for up to three years.

Motorcycles

Motorcycle licence plates are nearly the same as that for ordinary vehicles, but are less in length and look more like an elongated square than a banner-like rectangle. There are two lines of text (province code and letter on the top, numbers on the bottom).

For qingqi or low-powered motorbikes, blue licence plates are issued throughout.

Embassies and consulates

Since 2017, embassy and consulate vehicles have their own license plate with six white numbers followed by a single character denoting its diplomatic status, all on a black background (following the foreigner plate standard, as previously mentioned). Embassies use  (shǐ, from  meaning 'embassy') and are used only in Beijing. Consulates use  (lǐng, from  meaning 'consulate') and are used for representations outside Beijing. Numbers on embassy plates are formatted so that the first three digits represent the foreign entity/organization the vehicle is registered to while the last three digits are sequential, where 001 is (generally) the Ambassador's car, for example: 224·001使 is the car used by the American Ambassador. Numbers 002 to 005 are usually reserved for official use and therefore enjoy the comfort of the highest levels of diplomatic immunity.

In order to protect the privacy of foreign diplomats, the government does not release information on embassy vehicles, so it is possible that some data in the list of plate prefixes below may not be correct.

Other types

Vehicles for use in automobile tests, vehicles for use in driving schools (examination and test-driving), and vehicles at airports all have their own separate licence plates.

For automobile tests, licence plates consist of black characters on a yellow background with the suffix shi (试 short in Chinese for ce shi or test). For driving schools, different plates apply for test-drive vehicles (jiaolian che) and examination vehicles (kaoshi che).

Airports have licence plates with white characters on a green background with the designation min hang. This shade of green is slightly lighter than the variant used on normal licence plates prior to 1992. Some vehicles belonging to airports that operate in its vicinity (rather than inside its perimeters) have dark-green lettering on a white background. These plates, unlike others, permit the use of letter I (as in the SPIA-A00 series used in Shanghai Pudong International Airport)

Sometimes, to avoid privacy invasion, modern Chinese TV show series are set in fictitious locations. Vehicles featured in these shows often carry registration plates with non-valid provincial abbreviations and/or invalid typefaces.

Cross-border with Hong Kong and Macau

These plates often exist side by side with a local Hong Kong or Macau licence plates on the same car. See the section on Guangdong license plates.

Interim licence plates

Interim licence plates are a piece of paper to be affixed to the front of the vehicle's window, usually valid for 15 days.

Shortlived 2002 standard

For a short while in the summer of 2002, a new 2002 standard was instituted in several cities, including Beijing. They enabled number/alphabetical customisation. (The possible combinations were NNN-NNN, NNN-LLL and LLL-NNN, where N would be a number and L a letter. However, although the usage of "CHN", to designate China, was not permitted in the plates, that restriction, oddly enough, did not apply to the letters "PRC".) The VIN was also added to the new plates, and the plates were white, with a gradual blue tint at the bottom end of the plates. Black letters were used on the plate.

In late August 2002 new 2002 standard plates had their issuance temporarily interrupted, officially for technical reasons, but actually because some number/alphabetical combinations of a controversial nature in Mainland China were utilised. One of the biggest controversies was when a vehicle with plate number USA-911 was spotted in Beijing, causing an uproar as it was taken to be a reference to the September 11 attacks, and as such was criticized as being disrespectful to Americans. Equal uproars were created with such plates as PRC-001, and trademark violations were rife; the plate number IBM-001 and was seen. The WTO acronym was also spotted in the plates. In a society that is still rather conservative in this topic, the plate SEX-001 was the source of yet another controversy. The number 250, an insult in spoken Chinese, was also spotted in some plates.

Possibly due to the controversies as described above, as of summer 2003, the new plates are no longer being issued. Old plates of the 2002 standard are not being recalled. Cars who have lost their 2002-standard plates are disallowed to get a 2002-standard replacement. The 1992-standard plates will be issued instead.

New 2007 Standard (GA36－2007) 

The Ministry of Public Security has announced on October 30, 2007, that the 1992 vehicle license plate system will be overhauled on November 1, 2007.

 The current black license plates assigned to foreign-owned vehicles will be phased out. New vehicles will be issued "normal" blue license plates.
 Two roman letters (not including O, or I, which could be confused with numerals) may be included among the last five places of the plate number.
A minor difference between the 2007- and the 1992-standard plates is that the separator dot between the regional code and the serial on 2007-standard plates is embossed along the characters, while that on 1992-standard plates are pressed into the plate, in the opposite direction of the characters.

Number plates issued in the 1992 standard will not be recalled but black plates will no longer be issued. Neither will plates issued to embassies be affected.

It is believed this is a China-wide standard. Many provinces and municipal cities have since introduced personalized number plates with different limitations. It is generally possible to choose from several alphabetical-numerical combination and personalize some of the digits.

For some provinces it is possible to have a letter occupying the last place of the combination, possibly to increase combination numbers.

New Energy vehicles license plates

On November 21, 2016, the MPS announced the New Energy vehicles license plates which have been instituted in Shanghai, Nanjing, Wuxi, Jinan, and Shenzhen since December 1, 2016. These plates consist of a one-character provincial abbreviation, a letter indicating the city, and a six-character alphanumerical string, in which "D" ("E") means Electric car, "F" means other types of vehicles powered by New Energy. For small vehicles or Large New Energy vehicles, this letter is located in the first place or the last place, respectively.

New Energy Vehicle License Plates are instituted in more than 10 cities as of 2017.

Dimensions for the Chinese character remains at 45 × 90 mm as the 1992 standard, whereas numbers are reduced to thinner 43 × 90mm dimensions alongside a change in font, which is now found on 2019-standard registration plates for firetrucks as well.

List of prefixes 

The following lists all licence plate prefixes in use in the People's Republic of China, divided into four sections: municipalities, provinces, autonomous regions and others.

Municipalities

Beijing

The initial character on licence plates issued in Beijing is: 
(Color in Yellow)-buses 
 - Taxis
 - Suburbs
 - Ministry of Public Security
 - Central Guard Bureau of Beijing Garrison Military License

Chongqing
The initial character on licence plates issued in Chongqing is: 

The former division before May 18, 2017:
 — Urban area
A "T" is further appended to taxis, for example "".
 — Urban 
B "T" is further appended to taxis, for example "".
 — Yongchuan District, Jiangjin, Hechuan, Tongnan County, Tongliang County, Bishan County, Dazu County, Qijiang County, Rongchang County
 — Wanzhou District, Liangping County, Chengkou County, Wushan County, Wuxi County, Zhong County, Kaizhou District, Fengjie County, Yunyang County
 — Fuling District, Nanchuan, Dianjiang County, Fengdu County, Wulong County
 — Qianjiang District, Shizhu Tujia Autonomous County, Xiushan Tujia and Miao Autonomous County, Youyang Tujia and Miao Autonomous County, Pengshui Miao and Tujia Autonomous County
From May 18, 2017, Chongqing has no division for number plate prefixes, newly registed vehicles can choose any prefix among  from any district and county in Chongqing.

Shanghai
The initial character on licence plates issued in Shanghai is: 
 — Suburbs, not allowed to enter the urban area (i.e. not allowed to travel within the Outer Ring).
 — Chongming Island, Changxing Island, Hengsha Island, not allowed to leave the places above.

For the third character of the license plates (with 4 digits following): 
 M, N, U to X — Taxis. 
 Y — Vehicles for rent, owned by car renting operators.

Tianjin
The initial character on licence plates issued in Tianjin is: 
 — Taxis
 — Ministry of Public Security

Provinces

Anhui
The initial character on licence plates issued in Anhui is: 
—Hefei
—Wuhu
—Bengbu
—Huainan
—Ma'anshan
—Huaibei
—Tongling
—Anqing
—Huangshan
—Fuyang
—Suzhou
—Chuzhou
—Lu'an
—Xuancheng
—former Chaohu (prefecture-level, now merged into Hefei)
—Chizhou
—Bozhou

Fujian
The initial character on licence plates issued in Fujian is: 
—Fuzhou(福州)
—Putian
—Quanzhou
—Xiamen
—Zhangzhou
—Longyan
—Sanming
—Nanping
—Ningde
 — Provincial-level agencies, Pingtan Island
 — Police vehicles

Gansu
The initial character on licence plates issued in Gansu is: 
—Lanzhou
—Jiayuguan
—Jinchang
—Baiyin
—Tianshui
—Jiuquan
—Zhangye
—Wuwei
—Dingxi
—Longnan
—Pingliang
—Qingyang
—Linxia Hui Autonomous Prefecture
—Gannan Tibetan Autonomous Prefecture

Guangdong

The initial character on licence plates issued in Guangdong is: 
—Guangzhou (—Panyu)
—Shenzhen
—Zhuhai
—Shantou
—Foshan (—Gaoming, —Sanshui)
—Shaoguan
—Zhanjiang
—Zhaoqing (—Sihui)
—Jiangmen
—Maoming
—Huizhou
—Meizhou
—Shanwei
—Guangdong Provincial Public Security Department
—Heyuan
—Yangjiang
—Qingyuan
—Dongguan
—Zhongshan
—Chaozhou
—Jieyang
—Yunfu
—Shunde (District of Foshan, discontinued issuing from February 2018)
—Nanhai (District of Foshan, discontinued issuing from February 2018)
—Hong Kong & Macau: required only for vehicles frequently travelling to the mainland. Hong Kong and Macau issue registration plates on their own.

Guizhou
The initial character on licence plates issued in Guizhou is: 
—Guiyang
—Liupanshui
—Zunyi
—Tongren
—Qianxinan
—Bijie
—Anshun
—Qiandonnan
—Qiannan

Hainan
The initial character on licence plates issued in Hainan is: 
—Haikou
—Sanya
—Qionghai, Wenchang, Wanning, Ding'an, Tunchang, Chengmai, Lingao
—Wuzhishan, Dongfang, Baisha, Changjiang, Ledong, Lingshui, Baoting, Qiongzhong
—Yangpu Economic Development Zone
—Danzhou

Hebei
The initial character on licence plates issued in Hebei is: 
—Shijiazhuang
A "Z" is further appended to taxis, for example "".
—Tangshan
B "T" is further appended to taxis, for example "".
—Qinhuangdao
—Handan
—Xingtai
—Baoding
—Zhangjiakou
—Chengde
—Cangzhou
—Langfang
—Hengshui

Heilongjiang
The initial character on licence plates issued in Heilongjiang is: 
, —Harbin
—Qiqihar
—Mudanjiang
—Jiamusi
—Daqing
—Yichun
—Jixi
—Hegang
—Shuangyashan
—Qitaihe
—Suihua
—Heihe
—Official vehicles
—Daxing'anling Prefecture
—Nongken system

Henan
The initial character on licence plates issued in Henan is: 
, —Zhengzhou
—Kaifeng
—Luoyang
—Pingdingshan
—Anyang
—Hebi
—Xinxiang
—Jiaozuo
—Puyang
—Xuchang
—Luohe
—Sanmenxia
—Shangqiu
—Zhoukou
—Zhumadian
—Nanyang
—Xinyang
—Jiyuan

Hubei
The initial character on licence plates issued in Hubei is: 
—Wuhan
 — Taxis in Wuhan
—Huangshi
—Shiyan
 — Taxis in Shiyan
—Jingzhou
—Yichang
—Xiangyang
—Ezhou
—Jingmen
—Huanggang
—Xiaogan
—Xianning
—Xiantao
—Qianjiang
—Shennongjia
—Enshi Tujia and Miao Autonomous Prefecture
—Tianmen
—Suizhou

Hunan
The initial character on licence plates issued in Hunan is: 
—Changsha
—Zhuzhou
—Xiangtan
—Hengyang
—Shaoyang
—Yueyang
—Zhangjiajie
—Yiyang
—Changde
—Loudi
—Chenzhou
—Yongzhou
—Huaihua
—Provincial-level agencies (phased out in 2014)
—Xiangxi Tujia and Miao Autonomous Prefecture

Jiangsu
The initial character on licence plates issued in Jiangsu is: 
—Nanjing
—Wuxi
—Xuzhou
—Changzhou
, —Suzhou
—Nantong
—Lianyungang
—Huai'an
—Yancheng
—Yangzhou
—Zhenjiang
—Taizhou
—Suqian

Jiangxi
The initial character on licence plates issued in Jiangxi is: 
—Nanchang
—Ganzhou
—Yichun
—Ji'an
—Shangrao
—Fuzhou(抚州)
—Jiujiang
—Jingdezhen
—Pingxiang
—Xinyu
—Yingtan
—Nanchang extra

Jilin
The initial character on licence plates issued in Jilin is: 
—Changchun
—Jilin City
—Siping
—Liaoyuan
—Tonghua
—Baishan
—Baicheng
—Yanbian Korean Autonomous Prefecture
—Songyuan
—Changbai Mountain Protection Development Zone

Liaoning
The initial character on licence plates issued in Liaoning is: 
—Shenyang
—Dalian
A "T" is further appended to taxis, for example "".
—Anshan
—Fushun
—Benxi
—Dandong
—Jinzhou
—Yingkou
—Fuxin
—Liaoyang
—Panjin
—Tieling
—Chaoyang
—Police Vehicles (phased out in 2014)
—Huludao

Qinghai
The initial character on licence plates issued in Qinghai is: 
—Xining
 — Taxis in Xining
—Haidong
—Haibei Tibetan Autonomous Prefecture
—Huangnan Tibetan Autonomous Prefecture
—Hainan Tibetan Autonomous Prefecture
—Golog Tibetan Autonomous Prefecture
—Gyêgu Tibetan Autonomous Prefecture
—Haixi Mongol and Tibetan Autonomous Prefecture

Shaanxi
The initial character on licence plates issued in Shaanxi is: 
—Xi'an
 — Taxis in Xi'an
 — Taxis in Xi'an
 — Provincial-level agencies
—Tongchuan
—Baoji
—Xianyang
—Weinan
—Hanzhong
—Ankang
—Shangluo
—Yan'an
—Yulin
—Xi'an extra (approved in April 2020)
 — Yangling Gaoxin Agricultural Zone

Shandong
The initial character on licence plates issued in Shandong is: 
—Jinan
—Qingdao
—Zibo
—Zaozhuang
—Dongying
—Yantai
—Weifang
—Jining
—Tai'an
—Weihai
—Rizhao
—Binzhou
—Dezhou
—Police vehicles (phased out in 2019)
—Liaocheng
—Linyi
—Heze
—former Laiwu (prefecture-level, now merged into Jinan)
—Qingdao Extra (for taxis, tour buses, etc.)
—Weifang Extra
—Provincial-level agencies (phased out in 2019)
—Yantai Extra

Shanxi
The initial character on licence plates issued in Shanxi is: 
—Taiyuan
—Datong
—Yangquan
—Changzhi
—Jincheng
—Shuozhou
—Xinzhou
—Lüliang
—Jinzhong
—Linfen
—Yuncheng

Sichuan
The initial character on licence plates issued in Sichuan is: 
—Chengdu
—Mianyang (former Chongqing, sub-provincial city)
—Zigong
—Panzhihua
—Luzhou
—Deyang
—Chengdu extra (former Mianyang)
—Guangyuan
—Suining
—Neijiang
—Leshan
—Ziyang (former Wanxian, now merged into Chongqing)
—former Fuling (now merged into Chongqing)
—issued by Vehicle Management Office of Sichuan Provincial Public Security Department
—former Qianjiang Prefecture (now merged into Chongqing)
—Yibin
—Nanchong
—Dazhou
—Ya'an
—Ngawa Tibetan and Qiang Autonomous Prefecture
—Garzê Tibetan Autonomous Prefecture
—Liangshan Yi Autonomous Prefecture
—Guang'an
—Bazhong
—Meishan

Yunnan
The initial character on licence plates issued in Yunnan is: 
—Kunming
—former Dongchuan (prefecture-level, now merged into Kunming)
—Zhaotong
—Qujing
—Chuxiong Yi Autonomous Prefecture
—Yuxi
A "T" is further appended to taxis, for example "".
—Honghe Hani and Yi Autonomous Prefecture
—Wenshan Zhuang and Miao Autonomous Prefecture
—Pu'er
—Xishuangbanna Dai Autonomous Prefecture
—Dali Bai Autonomous Prefecture
—Baoshan
—Dehong Dai and Jingpo Autonomous Prefecture
—Lijiang
—Nujiang Lisu Autonomous Prefecture
—Dêqên Tibetan Autonomous Prefecture
—Lincang

Zhejiang
The initial character on licence plates issued in Zhejiang is: 
—Hangzhou
—Ningbo
—Wenzhou
—Shaoxing
—Huzhou
—Jiaxing
—Jinhua
—Quzhou
—Taizhou
—Lishui
—Zhoushan
 — Black license plates belonging to cars registered to foreign enterprises

Autonomous regions

Guangxi
The initial character on licence plates issued in Guangxi is: 
—Nanning
—Liuzhou
—Guilin
—Wuzhou
—Beihai
—Chongzuo
—Laibin
—Guilin
—Hezhou
—Yulin
—Baise
—Hechi
—Qinzhou
—Fangchenggang
—Guigang

Inner Mongolia
The initial character on licence plates issued in Inner Mongolia is: 
—Hohhot
—Baotou
—Wuhai
—Chifeng
—Hulunbuir
—Hinggan League
—Tongliao
—Xilin Gol League
—Ulaan Chab
—Ordos
—Bayan Nur
—Alxa League

Ningxia
The initial character on licence plates issued in Ningxia is: 
—Yinchuan
—Shizuishan
—Wuzhong
—Guyuan
—Zhongwei

Xizang Tibetan Autonomous Region
Initial character of licence plates used in Xizang Tibetan Autonomous Region is: 
—Lhasa
—Qamdo
—Shannan
—Xigazê
—Naqu
—Ngari Prefecture
—Nyingchi

Xinjiang
The initial character on licence plates issued in Xinjiang is: 
—Ürümqi
—Changji Hui Autonomous Prefecture
—Shihezi
—Kuitun
—Börtala Mongol Autonomous Prefecture
—Ili Kazakh Autonomous Prefecture
—Qoqek
—Altay
—Karamay
—Turpan
—Hami
—Bayin'gholin Mongol Autonomous Prefecture
—Aksu Prefecture
—Kizilsu Kirghiz Autonomous Prefecture
—Kashgar
—Hotan
—Kunyu

See also 
 Vehicle registration plates of Hong Kong
 Vehicle registration plates of Macau

References

External links
 Scanned images of GA36-2007 (License plate of motor vehicle of China)

China
License plates
China transport-related lists
 Registration plates